Western Dream is the fourth studio album by French producer Bob Sinclar. The album is one of his most successful albums, spawning the hit singles "Love Generation", which was a number one hit in Europe, "World, Hold On (Children of the Sky)", that also became a top ten hit in many European countries, "Rock This Party (Everybody Dance Now)", which was also a hit, reaching the top ten in most European countries and "Tennessee".

The album features guest vocal performances from "World's Greatest Lover" singer Farrell Lennon, Reggae artist Gary 'Nesta' Pine, Steve Edwards, Ron Carroll and MZ Toni.

Release dates
It was released on 11 July 2006 in North America, and was meant to be released in the UK, Japan and China on 10 July 2006, but instead was delayed until August 10 for Japanese release. For Australia and New Zealand, a release date of 1 May was chosen. In Europe, the album was released earlier, in the Netherlands on 24 April, 10 April in France, and 12 May in Germany.

Track listing

European version

American version

iTunes UK version

Charts

Weekly charts

Year-end charts

References

External links
Bob Sinclar Discography

2006 albums
Electronica albums by French artists
Bob Sinclar albums
Tommy Boy Records albums
Ministry of Sound albums
Yellow Productions albums